Maxwell Heights Secondary School is a Canadian high school located in Oshawa, Ontario, within the Durham District School Board. The school was established in September 2009 and is named after a previous school, Maxwell Heights Public School (1955–1995). The school runs on the Modified School Calendar, starting a week earlier than schools on the traditional calendar, and closing for one week in November.

References

External links
 

High schools in Oshawa
Educational institutions established in 2009
2009 establishments in Ontario